Root Hog or Die is the fourth and final album by Mojo Nixon and Skid Roper, released in 1989. Subsequently, Nixon released the solo album Otis in 1990. A compilation, Unlimited Everything, was released the same year.

Track listing 
All songs written by Nixon and published by Tallywacker Tunes/La Rana Music except as indicated.
 "Debbie Gibson Is Pregnant with My Two-Headed Love Child"
 "(619) 239-KING"
 "This Land Is Your Land" (Woody Guthrie)
 "Pirate Radio"
 "Chicken Drop"
 "Tennesse Jive" (sic) (Skid Roper)
 "Louisiana Liplock"
 "I'm a Wreck"
 "Legalize It"
 "Burn Your Money"
 "Circus Mystery" (Skid Roper)
 "She's Vibrator Dependent"
 "High School Football Friday Night"
6 appears only on the cassette and CD releases of the album; 13 appears only on the CD release.

Critical reception
The music critic Robert Christgau, who had previously criticized the alleged misogyny of Nixon's song "Stuffin' Martha's Muffin'", gave Root Hog or Die an A−, calling it "Nixon's finest artistic achievement". However, he was unimpressed with Roper's cuts, calling them "the usual yawn" and commenting that "Mojo's loyalty to his partner, who has-his-own-album-out God-help-us, is one reason I think he's got a good heart."

Personnel
 Mojo Nixon - guitar, vocals, wah-wah guitar
 Skid Roper - bongos, choir/chorus, guitar, bass guitar, tambourine, vocals, washboard
with:
East Memphis Slim - piano
Phony Joe - organ
Jim Spake - saxophone
Ben Cauley - trumpet
Bertram Brown, Jimmy Crosthwait, William C. Brown III - backing vocals
Donna Hauth, Susanne Jerome Taylor - jingle singing
Technical
Carol Tabor - assistant producer

References

External links
 Mojo Nixon's home page

1989 albums
Mojo Nixon albums
Skid Roper albums
Albums produced by Jim Dickinson
I.R.S. Records albums